Özden Öngün (born 10 September 1978) is a Turkish retired international footballer who played as a goalkeeper, and is the current goalkeeping coach of Fenerbahçe.

He has one international cap for Turkey. He has also played for Konyaspor, Kocaelispor, Sakaryaspor, Kartalspor, Kayserispor, MKE Ankaragücü and Mersin İdmanyurdu SK.

Öngün is married to the Turkish Cypriot model Korla.

References

External links

1978 births
Living people
Turkish footballers
Turkey international footballers
Association football goalkeepers
MKE Ankaragücü footballers
Çaykur Rizespor footballers
Denizlispor footballers
Kartalspor footballers
Kayseri Erciyesspor footballers
Kocaelispor footballers
Konyaspor footballers
Sakaryaspor footballers
Mersin İdman Yurdu footballers
Süper Lig players
Fenerbahçe S.K. (football) non-playing staff